Alamcode , also Alamkod, is a village in Malappuram district in the state of Kerala, India.

Demographics
At the 2001 India census, Alamcode had a population of 30,118 with 14,364 males and 15,754 females.
Alamcode panchayath is situated near the border of Trissur, Malappuram and Palakkad. The Changaramkulam police station is located in Alamcode panchyath.

Transportation
Alamkod village connects to other parts of India through Kuttippuram town.  National highway No.66 passes through Edappal and the northern stretch connects to Goa and Mumbai.  The southern stretch connects to Cochin and Trivandrum.   National Highway No.966 connects to Palakkad and Coimbatore.  The nearest airport is at Kozhikode.  The nearest major railway station is at Kuttippuram.

References

Cities and towns in Malappuram district
Kuttippuram area